Petrossian is a French business enterprise established in 1920 with a wide variety of products, but mainly fine spices, caviar and smoked mainly fish-based products. It was founded by two Armenian refugees, Melkoum and Mouchegh Petrossian, sons of a silkworm farmer from Tiflis (Tbilisi) in Georgia. The business kept close cooperation with the Soviet Union and Mouchegh had married Irène Mailoff, daughter of a Russian family and marketer of refined caviar in the 19th century. The relation with the Soviet authorities and businesses solidified with the 1930s. After the death of Melkoum Petrossian in 1972 and Mouchegh Petrossian in 1981, the son of the latter Armen Petrossian took the direction of the family business in 1991.

Petrossian has a showcase historic shop in Paris, at 18 boulevard de La Tour-Maubourg, leading a number of other fashionable enterprises, boutiques, and restaurants which the company runs in Paris, Brussels, Dubai, New York, Los Angeles and Las Vegas.

Petrossian maintained a remarkable hold on the caviar market and other Russian specialties like Chatka crabs and vodkas into the 1990s. As the trade in caviar became more competitive, the enterprise diversified with other lines of smoked fish, anguilles, herring, scallops (particularly the French Coquille Saint-Jacques), and even Chinese dim sum.

In 2001, the enterprise left its historic manufacturing plant in Pierrefitte-sur-Seine moving to Angers for wider operations. It also expanded its list of products also marketing foie gras, chocolates, truffles, candies, pâtés and cheeses and various bakeries. In 2017, Petrossian was still a leading international caviar brand with a total sales of 70 million euros and estimated at 20% of the world caviar market.

References

External links
Official website 
petrossian.com
petrossian.be 

Food and drink companies of France
French brands
Luxury brands
Food and drink companies established in 1920
1920 establishments in France
Companies based in Pays de la Loire
France–Soviet Union relations